Rion Hall is a late Federal style house near Halltown, West Virginia.  Built in 1836, it consists of a three-story brick house with a two-story kitchen wing connected by a wood hyphen.  The house was used as a headquarters for General Philip H. Sheridan during the American Civil War.

The house was built in 1836 by William Lucas.  Lucas was the son of Robert and Sarah Rion Lucas, and was born at Cold Spring. In 1838, Lucas was elected to the United States House of Representatives, serving a total of three terms. At William Lucas' death, the property passed to his son, Daniel Bedinger Lucas, a lawyer and a poet, who was briefly appointed to the US Senate by the Governor of West Virginia, but not seated. With Daniel Lucas' death the property passed to Virginia Lucas, whose accidental death in 1929 left the  house vacant for ten years. In 1938 the house changed hands and underwent renovation.

See also
Halltown Union Colored Sunday School

References

Houses on the National Register of Historic Places in West Virginia
Houses in Jefferson County, West Virginia
Houses completed in 1836
Federal architecture in West Virginia
Greek Revival houses in West Virginia
Robert Lucas family
National Register of Historic Places in Jefferson County, West Virginia